Multiple ships of the Royal Navy have been named HMS Mistletoe including:

 , a  launched in 1809 and lost in 1816
  an  composite gunboat launched in 1883 and sold in 1907
  an  sloop launched in 1917 and sold in 1921

Royal Navy ship names